The There's no Going Back – Serbia is Behind (NN–IJS) is a parliamentary right-wing, militarist political movement in Serbia, founded in January 2022, headed by retired Major general of the Army of Serbia and Montenegro Božidar Delić.

The movement is known to the public for its participation in the NADA coalition in the 2022 general elections, when the movement's president, Božidar Delić, was the holder of the electoral list in the 2022 parliamentary election.

Leaders

Electoral performance

Parliamentary elections

Presidential elections

See also 

 List of political parties in Serbia

References 

Serb nationalist parties
Organizations based in Belgrade
Political organizations
Political parties established in 2022
Nationalist parties in Serbia
Conservative parties in Serbia